Beaver Creek School District 26 is a public school district based in Yavapai County, Arizona, United States.

External links
 

School districts in Yavapai County, Arizona